The Boucher Trail is a hiking trail of the South Rim in Grand Canyon National Park, located in the U.S. state of Arizona.

Access and description
The trail officially begins at a low point on the Dripping Springs Trail, in the southwest part of Hermit Canyon.  Access to the Boucher Trail requires a hike of about  along the Hermit Trail and Dripping Springs Trail.  Cairns exist in key places and can be spotted with some careful looking.

The trail heads to the north and has little elevation change after leaving the Hermit Trail. There are a few short, sharp descents and climbs around minor rockfalls and washbeds. After about  the trail contours around Yuma Point and heads southwestward until a sharp descent at the head of Travertine Canyon through the Supai Group. This descent steepens above 25% at places, which requires care to descend. After the descent, the trail heads up for a short stretch on the east side of Travertine Canyon, then immediately crosses over to a long stretch on the west side of Travertine Canyon to the Whites Butte saddle between Travertine and Boucher Canyons.

After the Whites Butte saddle, the trail descends through a natural break in the Redwall Limestone onto the Tonto Platform to a junction with the Tonto Trail.  This section is not as steep as the Travertine Canyon section, but can still exceed a 20% grade.  The junction is marked by a noticeable cairn.  At the junction, the Tonto Trail heads east towards Hermit Canyon or west into the Boucher Creek drainage.

At the confluence of Boucher Creek and Topaz Creek, the Tonto Trail splits off and continues northwest, while the Boucher Trail follows the creek northeast as it continues to flow to the Colorado River, which marks the end of the trail. Boucher Creek's flow disappears and reappears numerous times on this section of the trail.

Condition
Grand Canyon National Park categorizes the Boucher Trail as a "primitive trail".  With this designation it receives only low-key maintenance as conditions warrant, or to prevent resource damage.  There are few patrols by park rangers along primitive trails, depending on daily usage.

The Boucher Trail is less travelled than the Hermit Trail on the other side of Hermit Canyon and is not as well defined.  Because of this, the trail can be hard to pick out in places and is overgrown in a few places by canyon flora.  The section descending the Supai Group in Travertine Canyon is marked by rockfalls and is exceedingly steep, requiring care when descending.

Water availability
The only water sources along the trail are in the last mile at Boucher Creek and at the Colorado River.  An additional water source can be found at Dripping Springs, on the Dripping Springs Trail about a mile northwest of its junction with the Boucher Trail.  All natural water sources need to be treated, filtered, or boiled prior to consumption.

Camping
Camping is allowed at-large along the Boucher Trail, except within ¼ mile of the junction with the Dripping Springs Trail.  The park requires selecting campsites that have been previously used.  Due to the proximity to water, there are many suitable camping locations around Boucher Creek.

Hazards
Hazards hikers can encounter along the 'Boucher Trail include dehydration, sudden rainstorms, flash flooding, loose footing, rockfall, encounters with wildlife, and extreme heat.  At the Colorado River, additional hazards include hypothermia (due to the river's consistently cold temperatures), trauma (due to collisions with boulders in rapids), and drowning. 

Hikers are more likely to find solitude and isolation in addition to other hazards related to desert hiking.

History
The trail is named for Grand Canyon prospector and guide Louis Boucher, who lived in a cabin he built alongside Boucher Creek while mining in the area.  He lived alone while in the canyon, making supply runs to the south rim from time to time.  Because of his solitude, he was often labeled as a hermit, and is often credited as being the hermit referenced by canyon features of the same name, including the Hermit Trail.

See also
List of trails in Grand Canyon National Park

References

External links

 Grand Canyon National Park, Official site

Hiking trails in Grand Canyon National Park

Grand Canyon, South Rim